Bruce Shoebottom (born August 20, 1963) is a Canadian former professional ice hockey player who played 35 games in the National Hockey League for the Boston Bruins between 1988 and 1990. The rest of his career, which lasted from 1985 to 1998, was spent in various minor leagues.

Biography
Shoebottom was born in Windsor, Ontario. As a youth, he played in the 1978 Quebec International Pee-Wee Hockey Tournament with a minor ice hockey team from Mississauga.

Shoebottom scored his only regular-season NHL goal on April 1, 1989, in Boston's 5–4 victory over the Quebec Nordiques.

During the Stanley up playoffs on April 7, 1988, versus the Buffalo Sabres, Shoebottom scored his first and only NHL playoff goal. Fans responded by throwing shoes on the ice. He also played one season for the Rochester Americans of the AHL. Shoebottom was known for his role as an enforcer. Also played for the San Diego Gulls in the 1990s.

Career statistics

Regular season and playoffs

References

Bibliography

External links
 

1965 births
Living people
Austin Ice Bats players
Binghamton Whalers players
Boston Bruins players
Canadian ice hockey defencemen
Fort Wayne Komets players
Ice hockey people from Ontario
Ligue Nord-Américaine de Hockey players
Los Angeles Kings draft picks
Maine Mariners players
New Haven Nighthawks players
Oklahoma City Blazers (1992–2009) players
Peoria Rivermen (IHL) players
Peterborough Petes (ice hockey) players
Rochester Americans players
San Diego Gulls (WCHL) players
Sportspeople from Windsor, Ontario